Anja Klinar (born 3 April 1988) is a butterfly and medley swimmer from Slovenia. She has competed for her native country at four Olympic Games, from 2004–2016. She represented Slovenia in the 4 × 200 m freestyle relay, 200 m butterfly and 400 individual medley at the 2004 Olympics, the 200 and 400 m individual medley at the 2008 Summer Olympics, the 4 × 200 m freestyle relay, 200 m butterfly and the 400 m individual medley at the 2012 Summer Olympics and the 200 m butterfly and the 4 × 200 m freestyle at the 2016 Olympics.

She is also a two-time gold medalist at the Mediterranean Games in the individual medley events, and medaled at both the short course and long course European Swimming Championships.

References

 Slovenian Swimming Federation
 

1988 births
Living people
Slovenian female swimmers
Olympic swimmers of Slovenia
Female butterfly swimmers
Female medley swimmers
Swimmers at the 2004 Summer Olympics
Swimmers at the 2008 Summer Olympics
Swimmers at the 2012 Summer Olympics
Swimmers at the 2016 Summer Olympics
European Aquatics Championships medalists in swimming
Sportspeople from Jesenice, Jesenice
Mediterranean Games medalists in swimming
Mediterranean Games gold medalists for Slovenia
Mediterranean Games silver medalists for Slovenia
Mediterranean Games bronze medalists for Slovenia
Swimmers at the 2005 Mediterranean Games
Swimmers at the 2009 Mediterranean Games
Swimmers at the 2013 Mediterranean Games
Swimmers at the 2018 Mediterranean Games